Joseph Wheless (Montgomery County, Tennessee 1868-1950) was an American lawyer who wrote promoting the Jesus myth theory during the early years of the 20th century.

He was son of Joseph Wheless Sr. (1830–1899), grandson of Aquilla Wheless. His mother Myra McCall, died when he was young, and his brothers and sisters were by his father's second wife. Wheless was raised Southern Methodist but later questioned the verity of the scriptures, studying their sources in detail. As a lawyer he defended American free-thinking and atheist organizations, was instructor in military jurisprudence at the University of Arkansas and held the rank of major in the department of the Judge Advocate General.

Also self-taught, Wheless was a successful lawyer and a very outspoken Jesus-was-a-myth writer. He studied for the bar while articled in his uncle's firm. Wheless served as counsel for several American free-thinking organizations and defended many cases involving issues of atheism. A specialist in South American law, he was also for some time an instructor in military jurisprudence at the University of Arkansas and a major in the Judge Advocate General's Department. For his writing on religious topics, he received the honorary DD from the University of Denver. According to Wheless not only had no one called Jesus ever lived, but Christianity and the Bible are based on deliberate fraud, Christianity's continued existence is a conspiracy using persecution and oppression to perpetuate itself, to enslave people.

Works
 Is it God's Word 1926
 Debunking the Law of Moses 1929
 Forgery in Christianity 1930

See also

 Aletheia M. D.
 Ethan Allen
 I. Newton Baker
 Dan Barker
 Rev. L. M. Birkhead, Unitarian humanist
 Luther Burbank
 William Kingdon Clifford
 Chapman Cohen
 Moncure Conway
 Jeremiah J. Crowley
 Clarence Darrow
 Earl Doherty
 Theodore Dreiser
 William Floyd
 George William Foote
 Clay Fulks, Arkansas Socialist
 Helen Gardener
 Marshall Gauvin
 Isaac Goldberg
 Emma Goldman
 Kersey Graves
 E. Haldeman-Julius
 Baron d'Holbach
 Rupert Hughes
 Robert G. Ingersoll
 James Hervey Johnson
 Julien Offray de La Mettrie
 Joseph L. Lewis
 M. M. Mangasarian
 Joseph McCabe
 John Edwin McGee
 Colonel John Henry Patterson (1867–1947) 
 Michael B. Paulkovich
 Charles Francis Potter
 Robert M. Price
 Salomon Reinach
 John Remsburg
 Ernest Renan
 Richard Robinson (1902–1996), An Atheist's Values
 G. Vincent Runyon
 Elizabeth Stanton
 Albert Schweitzer (1813-1883)
 Woolsey Teller
 Barbara Thiering
 Alfred Russel Wallace
 Lemuel Washburn
 Charles Watts
 G.A. Wells
 Andrew Dickson White
 Frank Zindler

References

American lawyers
American atheists
1868 births
1950 deaths
Christ myth theory proponents
Freethought writers
Writers about religion and science